Smurf Mountain was a powered mine train ride through a mountain past several animated scenes at Kings Dominion in Doswell, Virginia, United States.

History
In  1979, "The Lost World" opened, 4 years after Kings Dominion's opening.

In 1980, "Journey to Atlantis" was changed to "Haunted River", adding heavily themed spooky scenery. "Smurf Mountain" opened in 1984, replacing "Land of Dooz". It became the new nickname for the mountain after that period. Time Shaft was refurbished constantly because of people getting nauseous after riding.

Due to declining popularity, Smurf Mountain was ultimately closed in 1995, two years after Paramount Parks' purchase of the park. The former spot of Smurf Mountain was originally set to be home to an upcoming attraction themed to Congo. However, these plans were cancelled when the film underperformed at the box office. After sitting dormant for 3 years, it was finally replaced with Volcano, The Blast Coaster in 1998. In February 2019, it was announced that Volcano, The Blast Coaster would be removed and in May 2019, after 40 years, the entire mountain was demolished as well.

References

1984 establishments in Virginia
1995 disestablishments in Virginia
The Smurfs in amusement parks